The 1972 Grand Prix motorcycle racing season was the 24th F.I.M. Road Racing World Championship Grand Prix season. The season consisted of twelve Grand Prix races in six classes: 500cc, 350cc, 250cc, 125cc, 50cc and Sidecars 500cc. It began on 30 April, with West German Grand Prix and ended with Spanish Grand Prix on 23 September.

Season summary
Another year, another championship for Giacomo Agostini, claiming a record 11 victories to take his seventh consecutive 500cc crown for MV Agusta. Things were tighter in the 350cc class with Jarno Saarinen giving Agostini a strong challenge by winning three races, including a victory at the German Grand Prix held at the daunting Nürburgring race track, where Saarinen defeated Agostini for the first time in a head-to-head race. Saarinen also scored a double victory at the Czechoslovakian Grand Prix with victories in both the 250cc and 350cc classes. The threat from Saarinen's two stroke Yamaha was so strong that the previously dominant MV Agusta factory was forced to produce a new 350cc motorcycle for Agostini.

In the 250cc division, Saarinen would win a tight race in a season-long battle with Renzo Pasolini and Rod Gould. Angel Nieto claimed a double, winning the 125cc and 50cc championships for Derbi before the Spanish factory announced its pull out from Grand Prix racing. The Yamaha factory won its first-ever 500cc Grand Prix race at the season ending Spanish Grand Prix at Jarama when Chas Mortimer won the race after Agostini sat out the event after already winning the championship,

This would be the final season for the East German Grand Prix as a championship race, as SED officials, troubled by fans singing Das Lied der Deutschen (the West German national anthem) after Dieter Braun's victory the previous season, limited entries to only Eastern Bloc nations beginning in 1973.

1972 Grand Prix season calendar

Scoring system
Points were awarded to the top ten finishers in each race. Only the best of five races were counted on 50cc and Sidecars championships, while in the 125cc, 250cc, 350cc and 500cc championships, the best of seven races were counted.

500cc final standings

1972 350 cc Roadracing World Championship final standings

1972 250 cc Roadracing World Championship final standings

1972 125 cc Roadracing World Championship final standings

1972 50 cc Roadracing World Championship final standings

References

 Büla, Maurice & Schertenleib, Jean-Claude (2001). Continental Circus 1949–2000. Chronosports S.A. 

Grand Prix motorcycle racing seasons
Grand Prix motorcycle racing season